Bruce Lee and I (released in the United States as Bruce Lee: His Last Days, His Last Nights) is a 1976 Hong Kong biographical action film directed by Lo Mar, and starring Betty Ting Pei and Danny Lee. The film was released in Hong Kong on 9 January 1976. The film is based on Bruce Lee's last days leading up to his death in Pei's apartment at Hong Kong on 20 July 1973.

Plot
The movie is mainly Betty Ting's story with Bruce Lee based on real life events. Opens with Betty and Bruce rolling around in bed around the time he died. Continues with Betty telling her story to a bartender, beginning when she was a loner school girl, she meets Bruce when he saves her from a beating one night and gives her some money. She then attempts to break into show biz and meets Bruce again: from there they become lovers until his death.

Cast
Betty Ting Pei as herself
Danny Lee as Bruce Lee
 Lu Chin-ku as Chao Yueh
Unicorn Chan
Wong San as Lo Wei
Alexander Grand as Rensky
Yuen Cheung-yan as Thug attacking Betty in bar
Chan Lau as Thug in bar
Tino Wong as Thug in bar
Chow Yun-kin as Thug in bar
Yuen Shun-yee as Stuntman on Movie Set
Lee Chiu as Stuntman on Movie Set
Yuen Kwai as Thug
Chin Yuet-sang as Thug 
Alan Chui Chung-San as Thug
Hsu Hsia as Thug
Wong Pau-gei as Thug
Ho Pak-kwong as Waiter
Nam Seok-hun as Bartender
Chan Siu-gai as Extra on movie set
Chu Yau-ko as Gambler
Fung Ging-man
Chin Chun

See also
 List of Hong Kong films
 List of Hong Kong films of 1976

External links

References 

 Celestial Pictures Shaw Brothers Universe. (18 November 2012). Bruce Lee & I 李小龍與我 (1975) **Official Trailer** by Shaw Brothers [Video file]. Retrieved from https://www.youtube.com/watch?v=0K06ZX5FwyA
 Bruce Lee. (2019). Bruce Lee. [online] Available at: https://www.brucelee.com /Retrieved 2019-04-14.

1976 films
1976 martial arts films
1970s action films
Hong Kong biographical films
Bruceploitation films
Action films based on actual events
Films shot in Hong Kong
Hong Kong action films
Kung fu films
1970s Mandarin-language films
Biographical films about actors
1970s Hong Kong films
1980s Hong Kong films